Middletown is a neighborhood in San Diego, California, United States. It is bordered by Mission Hills to the north, the Midway District to the west, Hillcrest and Park West to the east, and Downtown to the south.

References
 

Neighborhoods in San Diego